Yoda Creek is a stream in the U.S. state of Mississippi.

Yoda is a name possibly derived from the Choctaw language and purported to mean "abode, domicile, habitation", but its etymology can not be stated with certainty.

References

Rivers of Mississippi
Rivers of Calhoun County, Mississippi
Mississippi placenames of Native American origin